Robert Gordon Pearson (born August 3, 1971) is a Canadian former professional ice hockey right winger who played in the National Hockey League (NHL).

Biography
Pearson was born in Oshawa, Ontario. As a youth, he played in the 1984 Quebec International Pee-Wee Hockey Tournament with a minor ice hockey team from Oshawa.

Pearson was drafted 12th overall by the Toronto Maple Leafs in the 1989 NHL Entry Draft. He played in 269 career NHL games, scoring 56 goals and 54 assists for 110 points. Pearson also played for the St. Louis Blues and the Washington Capitals.

On April 24, 2006, Pearson signed on as an assistant coach for the University of Ontario Institute of Technology Ridgebacks in Oshawa, Ontario, but later resigned from that position. In 2017, he was named the new head coach of Whitby Fury.

Career statistics

References

External links
UOIT Athletics Media Release
 

1971 births
Living people
Belleville Bulls players
Canadian ice hockey right wingers
Cleveland Lumberjacks players
Frankfurt Lions players
Sportspeople from Oshawa
Long Beach Ice Dogs (IHL) players
National Hockey League first-round draft picks
Newmarket Saints players
Orlando Solar Bears (IHL) players
Oshawa Generals players
Portland Pirates players
St. John's Maple Leafs players
St. Louis Blues players
Toronto Maple Leafs players
Toronto Maple Leafs draft picks
Washington Capitals players
Worcester IceCats players
Ice hockey people from Ontario
Canadian expatriate ice hockey players in Germany